JCB is a British multinational manufacturer of equipment for construction, agriculture, waste handling, and demolition, founded in 1945 and based in Rocester, Staffordshire, England. The word "JCB" is  also often used colloquially as a generic description for mechanical diggers and excavators and now even appears in the Oxford English Dictionary, although it is still held as a trademark.

History

Joseph Cyril Bamford Excavators Ltd. was founded by Joseph Cyril Bamford in October 1945 in Uttoxeter,  Staffordshire, England. He rented a lock-up garage . In it, using a welding set which he bought second-hand for £2-10s (= £2.50) from English Electric, he made his first vehicle, a tipping trailer from war-surplus materials. The trailer's sides and floor were made from steel sheet that had been part of air raid shelters. On the same day as his son Anthony was born, he sold the trailer at a nearby market for £45 (plus a part-exchanged farm cart) and at once made another trailer. At one time he made vehicles in Eckersley's coal yard in Uttoxeter. The first trailer and the welding set have been preserved.

In 1948, six people were working for the company, and it made the first hydraulic tipping trailer in Europe. In 1950, it moved to an old cheese factory in Rocester, still employing six. A year later, Bamford began painting his products yellow. In 1953, he developed JCB's first backhoe loader, and the JCB logo appeared for the first time. It was designed by Derby Media and advertising designer Leslie Smith. In 1957, the firm launched the "hydra-digga", incorporating the excavator and the major loader as a single all-purpose tool useful for the agricultural and construction industries.

By 1964, JCB had sold over 3,000 3C backhoe loaders. The next year, the first 360-degree excavator was introduced, the JCB 7. In 1978, the Loadall machine was introduced. The next year, the firm started its operation in India. In 1991, the firm entered a joint venture with Sumitomo of Japan to produce excavators, which ended in 1998. Two years later, a JCB factory was completed in Pooler near Savannah, Georgia, in the US, and the next year a factory was opened in Brazil.

In 2005, JCB bought a company, purchasing the German equipment firm Vibromax. In the same year, it opened a new factory in Pudong, China. Planning of a new £40 million JCB Heavy Products site began following the launch of an architectural design competition in 2007 managed by RIBA Competitions, and by the next year, the firm began to move from its old site on Pinfold Street in Uttoxeter to the new site beside the A50; the Pinfold Street site was demolished in 2009. During that year, JCB announced plans to make India its largest manufacturing hub. Its factory at Ballabgarh in Haryana was to become the world's largest backhoe loader manufacturing facility. Although JCB shed 2,000 jobs during the 2008 global financial crisis, in 2010 it rehired up to 200 new workers.

In 2013, JCB set up its fourth manufacturing facility in India. In 2014, it was reported that three out of every four pieces of construction equipment sold in India was a JCB, and that its Indian operations accounted for 17.5% of its total revenue. JCB-based memes have also become prevalent in India.

JCB began manufacturing 20-30 tonne excavators in Solnechnogorsky District in Russia in 2017. Due to trade sanctions imposed following the 2022 Russian invasion of Ukraine, JCB suspended its operations in Russia in March 2022.

Products
Many of the vehicles produced by JCB are variants of the backhoe loader, including tracked or wheeled variants, mini and large version and other variations, such as forklift vehicles and telescopic handlers for moving materials to the upper floors of a building site. The company also produces wheeled loading shovels and articulated dump trucks.

Its JCB Fastrac range of tractors, which entered production in 1990, can drive at speeds of up to 75 km/h (40 mph) on roads and was featured on the BBC television programme Tomorrow's World, and years later as Jeremy Clarkson's tractor of choice in Top Gear. The firm makes a range of military vehicles, including the JCB HMEE. It licenses a range of rugged feature phones and smartphones designed for construction sites. The design and marketing contract was awarded to Data Select in 2010, which then lost the exclusive rights in 2013.

JCB power systems make a hydrogen combustion engine which aims to be cost effective by reusing parts from the company's Dieselmax engines.

JCB Insurance Services is a fully owned subsidiary of JCB that provides insurance for customers with funding from another fully owned subsidiary, JCB Finance.

JCB Dieselmax

In April 2006, JCB announced that they were developing a diesel-powered land speed record vehicle known as the 'JCB Dieselmax'. The car is powered by two modified JCB 444 diesel power plants using a two-stage turbocharger to generate 750 bhp, one engine driving the front wheels and the other the rear wheels.

Controversies and criticism

Violation of EU antitrust law

In December 2000, JCB was fined €39.6m by the European Commission for violating European Union antitrust law. The fine related to restrictions on sales outside allotted territories, purchases between authorised distributors, bonuses and fees which restricted out of territory sales, and occasional joint fixing of resale prices and discounts across different territories. JCB appealed the decision, with the European Court of First Instance upholding portions of the appeal and reducing the original fine by 25%. JCB appealed to the European Court of Justice but this final appeal was rejected in 2006, with the court slightly increasing the reduced fine by €864,000.

Tax avoidance 

In 2017, a Reuters study of JCB group accounts found that between 2001 and 2013, the JCB group paid £577 million to JCB Research, an unlimited company that does not have to file public accounts and which has only two shares, both owned by Anthony Bamford. JCB Research has been described as an obscure company, allegedly worth £27,000, but which donated £2m to the Conservative Party in the run up to the 2010 election, making it the largest donor. Ownership of the company which has never filed accounts is disputed by the Bamford brothers. According to a Guardian report, much of the Bamford money was held in shares in offshore trusts. 
JCB Service, the main JCB holding company, is owned by a Dutch parent company, ‘Transmissions and engineering Netherlands BV’, which is ultimately controlled by “Bamford family interests”. According to Ethical Consumer, JCB has six subsidiaries in jurisdictions considered to be tax havens, in Singapore, the Netherlands, Hong Kong, Delaware and Switzerland.

Involvement in Israeli settlements

On 12 February 2020, the United Nations published a database of all business enterprises involved in certain specified activities related to the Israeli settlements in the Occupied Palestinian Territories, including East Jerusalem, and in the occupied Golan Heights. JCB has been listed on the database in light of its involvement in activities related to "the supply of equipment and materials facilitating the construction and the expansion of settlements and the wall, and associated infrastructures". The international community considers Israeli settlements built on land occupied by Israel to be in violation of international law.

In October 2020, the British government decided to investigate a complaint that JCB’s sale of equipment to Israel did not comply with the human rights guidelines set by the Organisation for Economic Co-operation and Development. The UK National Contact Point (NCP), part of the UK’s Department of International Trade, agreed to review a complaint against JCB submitted by a charity, Lawyers for Palestinian Human Rights. JCB said it had no “legal ownership” of its machinery once sold to Comasco, its sole distributor of JCB equipment in Israel.

Bailout loan
In 2020, JCB received a £600m loan in emergency financial aid from the UK government, during the coronavirus pandemic, despite its ultimate ownership being in the Netherlands and having reported a record £447 million profit the previous year. Its chief executive Graeme Macdonald said: “Although not a public company, we are eligible for CCF because of our contribution to the UK economy. We don’t expect to utilise it in the short-term but it gives us an insurance policy if there is further disruption from or second spike or other impact around the world.”

Brexit
The company was a member of the CBI business lobby group until October 2016, when it was reported that JCB had left the CBI in the summer of 2016 following the Brexit vote due to the organisation's anti-Brexit stand. In May 2021, JCB chairman Anthony Bamford rejected an invitation to rejoin CBI, after previously having called it a "waste of time" that "didn’t represent my business or private companies".

Bamford donated £100,000 to Vote Leave, the official pro-Brexit group, and JCB has also been a significant donor to the UK Conservative Party; since 2007 JCB and related Bamford entities have given the party £8.1m in cash or kind.

In popular culture

JCB is prominently featured in the song "JCB" by music group Nizlopi, which achieved UK number one status. The song is about a boy who goes to work with his father for the day.
A JCB (not talking) named Jekub appears in volume 2 (Diggers) of The Bromeliad (alias Nomes) series by Terry Pratchett.
The Lego Technic range featured a scale-model of the JCB backhoe (Set 8862), complete with working hydraulics systems (simulated using pneumatics) and many other features of the original.
The 2017 movie Alien: Covenant featured 20 JCB machines in a spacecraft's "terraforming bay" to be used on a mission to establish a new colony on another planet.
JCB was a major sponsor of the Williams F1 Formula 1 team, with its logo prominent on the F1 cars and hospitality for 2018 season. In 2019 it became a sponsor of Racing Point F1 Team.  For the 2021 Formula 1 season, it was sponsor of the Aston Martin F1 Team, which is a rebrand of the former Racing Point F1 team.

References

External links

 
Construction equipment manufacturers of the United Kingdom
Mining equipment companies
Engine manufacturers of the United Kingdom
Manufacturing companies of England
Forklift truck manufacturers
Agricultural machinery manufacturers of the United Kingdom
Tractor manufacturers of the United Kingdom
Mobile phone manufacturers
English brands
Defence companies of the United Kingdom
Privately held companies of England
Family-owned companies of England
British companies established in 1945
Manufacturing companies established in 1945
Multinational companies headquartered in England
1945 establishments in England
Borough of East Staffordshire
Companies based in Staffordshire
Conservative Party (UK) donors
Electrical generation engine manufacturers
Automotive transmission makers